The 2015–16 Texas A&M Aggies men's basketball team represented Texas A&M University in the 2015–16 college basketball season. The team's head coach was Billy Kennedy, in his fifth season. The team played their home games at Reed Arena in College Station, Texas and its fourth season as a member of the Southeastern Conference. They finished the season 28–9, 13–5 in SEC play to win a share of the SEC regular season championship. They defeated Florida and LSU to advance to the championship game of the SEC tournament where they lost to Kentucky. They received an at-large bid to the NCAA tournament where they defeated Green Bay and Northern Iowa to advance to the Sweet Sixteen where they lost to Oklahoma.

Previous season
The team had a 21–12 (11–7 in Conference Play) record and entered the SEC Tournament as the 5th seed after losing two games to end conference play, where it lost to Auburn. The team earned an NIT Bid as a 2 seed (despite making noise for a bid to the NCAA Tournament which was silenced after a losing skid at the end of the season) and lost in the 2nd round of the NIT To Louisiana Tech after beating Montana in the 1st round.

Departures

Incoming transfers

Recruits

Recruits for class of 2016

Roster

Schedule

|-
!colspan=12 style="background:#500000; color:#FFFFFF;"| Exhibition

|-
!colspan=12 style="background:#500000; color:#FFFFFF;"| Regular season

|-
!colspan=12 style="background:#500000; color:#FFFFFF;"| SEC tournament

|-
!colspan=12 style="background:#500000; color:#FFFFFF;"| NCAA tournament

Rankings

References

Texas A&M Aggies men's basketball seasons
TexasAandM
TexasAandM